The lowlands tree-kangaroo (Dendrolagus spadix), also spelt "lowland," is a long-tailed, furry, bear-like mammal found only in lowland tropical rainforests on the island of New Guinea (in Papua New Guinea). It is a species of tree-kangaroo (genus Dendrolagus), which are tree-dwelling animals that feed on leaves or other plant matter. Tree-kangaroos are in the macropod family (Macropodidae) with kangaroos, and like other marsupials they carry their young in a pouch. The lowlands tree-kangaroo is threatened by habitat loss.

The species is endemic to the Southern New Guinea lowland rainforests ecoregion in the southwestern part of New Guinea, within the nation of Papua New Guinea.

See also

References

Macropods
Marsupials of New Guinea
Endemic fauna of Papua New Guinea
Mammals of Papua New Guinea
Vulnerable fauna of Oceania
Mammals described in 1936
Taxonomy articles created by Polbot